SS Princess Alice may refer to:

 , a steamship that sank in the Thames 3 September 1878 with an estimated 640 dead
 , under this name from 1904 to 1917 for North German Lloyd; as SS Kiautschou for Hamburg-America Line from launch, 1900–1904; as USS Princess Matoika for U.S. Navy, 1917–1919; as USAT Princess Matoika for U.S. Army, 1919–1921; as SS Princess Matoika in passenger service, 1921–1922; as SS President Arthur for United States Lines, 1922–1925, and for American Palestine Line, 1925; as SS City of Honolulu for Los Angeles Steamship Company, 1926–1933; scrapped 1933
 , a coastal liner in the early 20th century fleet of Canadian Pacific Railway Co.

Ship names